Lewis W. Whistler (né Wissler; March 10, 1868 – December 30, 1959) was an American Major League Baseball player who played the majority of his career as a first baseman. In his four-season career, he played for the New York Giants (1890–1891), Baltimore Orioles (1892), Louisville Colonels (1893) and St. Louis Browns. His major league totals include: 272 games played, 1014 at bats, and a .244 batting average. Whistler died in his hometown of St. Louis, Missouri at the age of 91, and is interred at Bethany Cemetery in Pagedale, Missouri.

External links

1868 births
1959 deaths
Major League Baseball first basemen
Baseball players from St. Louis
Baltimore Orioles (NL) players
New York Giants (NL) players
Louisville Colonels players
St. Louis Browns (NL) players
19th-century baseball players
Chattanooga Lookouts managers
Wichita Braves players
San Antonio Missionaries players
San Antonio Cowboys players
Galveston Giants players
Houston Babies players
Houston Red Stockings players
Evansville Hoosiers players
Washington Senators (minor league) players
Albany Senators players
New Orleans Pelicans (baseball) players
Chattanooga Warriors players
Mobile Bluebirds players
Detroit Tigers (Western League) players
Grand Rapids Bob-o-links players
Springfield Governors players
Syracuse Stars (minor league baseball) players
Schenectady Electricians players
Wheeling Stogies players
Chattanooga Lookouts players
Montgomery Black Sox players
Memphis Egyptians players